Ned R. Endress (March 2, 1918 – June 19, 2010) was an American professional basketball player. He was a 6'2" (1.88 m) 200 lb (90 kg) forward-guard and played professionally for the Cleveland Rebels of the Basketball Association of America (BAA) in 1946–47, averaging 0.9 point and 0.3 assists per game.  Prior to that, Endress played college basketball at University of Akron. He was a lifetime member of the National Basketball Retired Players Association.

BAA career statistics

Regular season

References

External links

1918 births
2010 deaths
Akron Zips football players
Akron Zips men's basketball players
American men's basketball players
Basketball players from Akron, Ohio
Cleveland Allmen Transfers players
Cleveland Chase Brassmen players
Cleveland Rebels players
High school basketball coaches in the United States
Shooting guards
Small forwards